The Upano River is a river of Ecuador. This river runs from the sierra to the depths of the Amazon. The river is mainly used locally for fishing, there is also rafting and kayaking offered out of Macas (class III-V). The Rio Upano is known for its fossils, sandy beaches and many hot springs. There are numerous river overlooks including one a block from the central park of Logroño. There is also a cable car that crosses the river outside of Logroño across from Shuar Community- “La Union”.

See also
List of rivers of Ecuador

References
 Rand McNally, The New International Atlas, 1993.
  GEOnet Names Server
 Water Resources Assessment of Ecuador 
Logroño Turismo

Rivers of Ecuador